Emslie is a surname. Notable people with the surname include:

Alfred Edward Emslie (1848–1918), British painter and photographer
Bob Emslie (1859–1943), Canadian baseball pitcher 
Claire Emslie (born 1994), Scottish footballer
David Emslie (born 1955), South African cricketer
Derek Emslie, Lord Kingarth (born 1949), Scottish judge
Erik Emslie (born 1965), South African cricketer
George Emslie, Baron Emslie (1919–2002), Scottish judge
Howard Emslie (1922–1985), South African cricketer
Isabel Emslie Hutton (1887–1960), Scottish doctor
John Emslie (1813–1875), British cartographer and artist
John Philipps Emslie (1839–1913), British topographical artist and folklorist
Nigel Emslie, Lord Emslie (born 1947), Scottish judge
Paul Emslie (born 1988), Scottish footballer
Peter Emslie (born 1968), South African cricketer
Rosalie Emslie (1891–1977), British painter
Rosalie M. Emslie (1854–1932), British painter
William Emslie (1908–1969), Scottish rugby union player